Naujawan is 1951 Hindi film directed by Mahesh Kaul. It stars Premnath, Nalini Jaywant, Yashodhara Katju, Kamal Mehra, Zeb Qureshi, Cuckoo, S.N. Banerjee.

Soundtrack

The music was composed by S.D. Burman and Sahir Ludhianvi wrote the lyrics. The movie is remembered for the hauntingly melodious song "Thandi Hawayein" by Lata Mangeshkar. Notably, legendary music director Ravi started his musical career with this film by singing in chorus.

 "Pi Pi Piya" - Kishore Kumar and Shamshad Begum
 "Thandi Hawayein" - Lata Mangeshkar
 "Panghat Pe Dekho Aayee Milan Ki Bela" - Mohammed Rafi, Geeta Dutt, Shamshad Begum and chorus
 "Ek Aag Dahekta" - Manna Dey
 "Jiya Jaye Piya Aaja" - Lata Mangeshkar
 "Zara Jhoom Le" - Mohammed Rafi and Geeta Dutt
 "Dekho Dekho Ji Kuch bhi" - Kishore Kumar and Lata Mangeshkar

References

External links

1951 films
1950s Hindi-language films
Indian drama films
1951 drama films
Indian black-and-white films